Cribrarula toliaraensis is a species of sea snail, a cowry, a marine gastropod mollusk in the family Cypraeidae, the cowries.

This is a species inquirenda, Further research is needed, including molecular data, to confirm it as a valid subspecies; it is likely a synonym of C. cribraria comma).

Description

Distribution

References

External links

Cypraeidae
Gastropods described in 2007